The SD20-2 was a type of diesel-electric locomotive created in 1979/1980 by the Baltimore and Ohio Railroad by rebuilding EMD SD35 locomotives.  Five of the B&O's SD35 fleet were rebuilt at their Cumberland Yard by fitting a non-turbocharged EMD 645 engine and upgraded electrical systems.  They were placed in service at the B&O Queensgate Yard in Cincinnati, Ohio attached to slugs, engineless units with traction motors that draw their power from the "mother" unit.  

With the B&O, the SD20-2s were numbered #7700–7704. At some point, #7700 and #7702 swapped numbers.  All of them passed to CSX Transportation as #2400-2404, but are now withdrawn from CSX service.  One of the units, #2401, went on to the Ohio Central Railroad System; #2401 was in turn resold to the Pacific Harbor Line and reassigned road #45 (pictured at right).  #2404 was scrapped by Cycle Systems of Roanoke, Virginia in August 2006.

See also
 List of GM-EMD locomotives

References

External links
 The History of EMD Diesel Engines at the Pacific Southwest Railway official website.

Baltimore and Ohio Railroad
C-C locomotives
Standard gauge locomotives of the United States
Railway locomotives introduced in 1979